Penina Hotel & Golf Resort is a golf resort in the Algarve region of southern Portugal, between Portimão and Lagos. The resort spans  and contains a hotel complex, golf courses, tennis courts, a football pitch and a running track. It is owned and operated by JJW Hotels & Resorts.

History

In 1966 it was the first course to be built in the Algarve. The resort's 18-hole Championship Course, founded by John Stilwell and designed by Sir Henry Cotton was originally called The Penina and has been the venue for the Portuguese Open on many occasions, most recently in 2006. There are also two 9-hole courses, the Resort Course and the Academy Course.

Championship Course

Score Card

See also
 List of golf courses in Portugal

References

External links
 JJW Hotels & Resorts 
 Penina Golf & Resort

Golf clubs and courses in Portugal
Buildings and structures in the Algarve